Artcurial is a French auction house which has its headquarters at the historic Hôtel Marcel Dassault in Paris.

History
In 2001, Nicolas Orlowski acquired the Artcurial Gallery from L'Oréal. He hired auctioneers Francis Briest, Hervé Poulain and Rémy Le Fur, and established an auction house by the same name.

It is a subsidiary of the Dassault Group. Additionally, Monegasque billionaire Michel Pastor was a shareholder until his death in 2014.

As of 2014, it was the third largest auction house in Paris after Christie's and Sotheby's.

References

External links
 
 

French auction houses
Companies based in Paris
Retail companies established in 2001
Dassault family